Heater cells are specialized modified muscle cells located at the base of the brain in billfish, including swordfish. They act to maintain temperatures in the brain and eyes above ambient temperature.  Producing heat and maintaining temperature requires high levels of metabolic activity, as such, the heater cells have the highest mitochondrial densities of any animal cell, ranging from 55% to 70% of the total cell volume.

References 

Fish anatomy